Groenewold is a surname. Notable people with the surname include:

Hilbrand J. Groenewold (1910–1996), Dutch theoretical physicist
Ilka Groenewold (born 1985), German television presenter and athlete
Renate Groenewold (born 1976), Dutch speed skater and cyclist

See also
Groenewald